The 2004–05 Israel State Cup was the 66th season of Israel's nationwide football cup competition and the 51st after the Israeli Declaration of Independence.

The competition was won by Maccabi Tel Aviv, who had beaten Maccabi Herzliya on penalties after 2–2 in the final.

By winning, Maccabi Tel Aviv qualified to the second round of the UEFA Cup.

Results

Eighth Round
The draw for the Eighth Round was held on 27 January 2005. Most matches were played on 8 February 2005, except for the match between Hapoel Marmorek and Maccabi Tirat HaCarmel, which was played on 22 February 2005.

Ninth Round
Most matches were played between 1 March 2005 and 9 March 2005.

Round of 16

Quarter finals

Semi–finals

Final

References
100 Years of Football 1906–2006, Elisha Shohat (Israel), 2006

External links 
100 Years of Football 1906–2006, Elisha Shohat (Israel), 2006, p. 325
RSSSF page

Israel State Cup
State Cup
Israel State Cup seasons